For the Eurovision Song Contest 1999, held in Jerusalem, France entered "Je veux donner ma voix" to compete, performed by Nayah. Television channel France 2 was originally in charge of the French participation, however it was later changed to France 3 due to the broadcast of the French Rugby League Championship which conflicted with the date for the final. France 3 opted to choose their entry via public selection, marking the first time since 1987 France held a national final to select their entry.

Before Eurovision

Eurovision 1999: la sélection 
Eurovision 1999: la sélection was the national final organised by France 3 to select France's entry for the Eurovision Song Contest 1999. The competition took place on 2 March 1999 at the L'Olympia in Paris and hosted by Julien Lepers and Karen Cheryl. The show was broadcast on France 3.

Competing entries 
From 600 submissions originally received by France 2, a two-member selection committee reviewed the received submissions and selected twelve entries to compete in the national final. The selection committee consisted of Monique Le Marcis (former RTL Head of Musical Programming) and Catherine Régnier (M6 music programmer).

Final 
The final took place on 2 March 1999. Twelve entries competed and the winner, "Je veux donner ma voix" performed by Nayah, was selected by the combination of public televoting (50%) and a jury panel (50%). The jury panel consisted of Gilbert Bécaud, Marie Myriam, Jocelyne Béroard, Lââm, Sandy Valentino, Richard Cocciante, Jean-Pierre Bouryayre, Laurent Petitguillaume, Jean-Michel Boris and Jean Réveillon, with each member assigning scores to each entry ranging from 1 (lowest) to 10 (highest). The rankings of each half were used to calculate the result; hence, the song with the lowest total won. There was a tie for first place between Ginie Line and Nayah; however, Nayah won as she received the most votes from the public.

At Eurovision
Nayah performed 10th in the running order of the contest, following Denmark and preceding the Netherlands. At the close of the voting she received 14 points, placing 19th of 23.

Voting

References

External links
French National Final 1999

1999
Countries in the Eurovision Song Contest 1999
Eurovision
Eurovision